Prince Edward Road MRT station is a future underground Mass Rapid Transit (MRT) station on the Circle line in Downtown Core, Singapore. This station is part of Stage 6 of the Circle line which will "close the circle" between the HarbourFront and Marina Bay stations. It is built along Shenton Way, near the junctions of Keppel Road and Palmer Road.

First announced in 2015, the station originally had the working name Prince Edward. Construction of the station began in 2017. In 2018, the station was named Prince Edward Road during a naming vote by the Land Transport Authority (LTA). The station was to be opened in 2025 along with the other CCL6 stations, but was delayed to 2026 due to the COVID-19 pandemic in Singapore.

History

The station was first announced on 29 October 2015 as part of the Stage 6 of the Circle line. Construction began at the end of 2017, with expected completion in 2026.

Three station names – 'Prince Edward Road', 'Palmer Road' and 'Parsi Road' – were shortlisted by the Land Transport Authority (LTA) for public voting. The station name was then finalised as Prince Edward Road.

To facilitate the station's construction, the Shenton Way Bus Terminal was relocated on 25 June 2017. On 8 March 2020, the concrete casting for the station's underground roof slab was completed. The Tunnel Boring Machine (TBM) Sun Wu has also completed half of the tunnelling works towards the adjacent Cantonment station. Due to the COVID-19 pandemic, tunnelling work was briefly suspended to prevent any spread of the virus. In September, the Sun Wu TBM managed to tunnel underneath the old Tanjong Pagar Railway station building. The tunnelling towards the station required close monitoring with devices installed to ensure no damage made to the sculptures and interior of the station.

Station details

Prince Edward Road station will serve the CCL between the Keppel and Marina Bay stations. The official station code is CC32. Prince Edward Road station will be located near Bestway Building and the heritage buildings of Hock Teck See Temple and Masjid Haji Muhammad Salleh.

Designed by RDC Architects, the station will have two entrances. Prince Edward station station will have three underground levels with two stacked platforms. The concourse will have a motif resembling a ship hull.

References

Bukit Merah
Mass Rapid Transit (Singapore) stations
Railway stations scheduled to open in 2026